Sucha Wieś  is a village in the administrative district of Gmina Raczki, within Suwałki County, Podlaskie Voivodeship, in north-eastern Poland.

References

Villages in Suwałki County